Florida Lakewatch, established in 1986, is a volunteer water-monitoring program coordinated through the University of Florida. This project is headquartered at Gainesville, Florida, within the campus of the University of Florida. Florida Lakewatch has in its history obtained funding from a number of sources, but currently is mostly funded by the state of Florida.

Volunteer involvement
There are more than 5,400 lakes in Florida and a number of rivers. The Florida Lakewatch program provides support to citizens interested in monitoring lakes and providing data they collect for the program.  The Department of Fisheries and Aquatic Sciences of the University of Florida provides faculty, staff and laboratory support to more than 1,800 volunteers. Reliable water chemistry data has been collected from more than 1,000 lakes from at least fifty counties. Florida Lakewatch works directly with citizens who live on or use lakes, rivers or waterways and are willing to participate in a long-term monitoring effort. These volunteers must have access to a boat, since much of the data collection must be done away from lake shores. Florida Lakewatch has at least basic information on 5,420 lakes in Florida.

Services provided
Florida Lakewatch provides a variety of items useful to those interested in lakes. These include (all in the Florida Lakewatch website):
Bathymetric maps of approximately 320 Florida lakes
Various types of data grouped by subject matter
An online library of almost all the project's newsletters
Information about all the other Florida Lakewatch publications
Information about periodic volunteer meetings at the county level

Links to Florida online water atlases
The Florida Lakewatch website contains links to the Florida Atlas of Lakes, produced by the University of South Florida's Water Atlas program. This program is supported by Florida Lakewatch and the Florida Lake Management Society. Through the Florida Atlas of Lakes seven county water atlases can be accessed. These are: the Polk County Water Atlas, the Hillsborough Water Atlas, the Pinellas County Water Atlas, the Sarasota County Water Atlas, the Seminole County Water Atlas, the Orange County Water Atlas, the Manatee County Water Atlas.

References

Water organizations in the United States
University of Florida
Environmental organizations based in Florida
1986 establishments in Florida
Organizations established in 1986